Liptena decipiens, the deceptive liptena, is a butterfly in the family Lycaenidae. It is found in Nigeria, Cameroon, Gabon, the Republic of the Congo and the Democratic Republic of the Congo. The habitat consists of primary forests.

Subspecies
 Liptena decipiens decipiens (Nigeria, western Cameroon)
 Liptena decipiens etoumbi Stempffer, Bennett & May, 1974 (Congo, northern Democratic Republic of the Congo)
 Liptena decipiens leucostola (Holland, 1890) (southern Cameroon, Gabon, Congo, Democratic Republic of the Congo: Uele, Equateur, Kinshasa and Sankuru)

References

Butterflies described in 1890
Liptena
Butterflies of Africa